Craig Michael Barrett (born 16 November 1971, in Ōpunake) is a New Zealand athlete specialising in racewalking. He was the dominant racewalker in New Zealand for many years and is the nation's record holder for the 3 km, 20 km, 30 km, 50 km and 2-hour disciplines. He attended the Olympic Games in Atlanta (1996), Sydney (2000) and Athens (2004). He won a silver medal in the 50 km walk at the 2002 Commonwealth Games in Manchester.

During the 1998 Commonwealth Games, Barrett collapsed within one kilometre of the finish line whilst leading the 50 km walk, reportedly as a result of dehydration.

Personal bests

50 km walk results

1995 IAAF World Championships 22nd 
1996 Olympic Games 33rd 
1997 IAAF World Championships 13th 
1998 Commonwealth Games DNF 
1999 IAAF World Championships 7th 
2000 Olympic Games 18th 
2001 IAAF World Championships DNF 
2002 Commonwealth Games 2nd 
2003 IAAF World Championships DSQ
2004 Olympic Games 29th
2005 IAAF World Championships DSQ
2006 Commonwealth Games 4th

External links 
Architecture website

Wicked Cool Kiwis

References 

1971 births
Living people
New Zealand male racewalkers
People from Ōpunake
Olympic athletes of New Zealand
Athletes (track and field) at the 1996 Summer Olympics
Athletes (track and field) at the 2000 Summer Olympics
Athletes (track and field) at the 2004 Summer Olympics
Commonwealth Games silver medallists for New Zealand
Athletes (track and field) at the 1994 Commonwealth Games
Athletes (track and field) at the 1998 Commonwealth Games
Athletes (track and field) at the 2002 Commonwealth Games
Athletes (track and field) at the 2006 Commonwealth Games
Commonwealth Games medallists in athletics
Medallists at the 2002 Commonwealth Games